Greta Valenti is an American entrepreneur and artist. She is a documentary filmmaker, producer of the television show Live From Daryl's House, founder and CEO of Grow Vision creative studios, and the lead singer of the bands Beaux Gris Gris & The Apocalypse and Well Hung Heart.

Life and career 
Greta Valenti was born in Covington, Louisiana. From the age of four, she performed on stage and in commercials and performed off-broadway at the age of 13. Valenti graduated school early, emancipated herself at the age of 17, and moved to California to join the touring performance group The Young Americans. Valenti performed in four national U.S. tours with The Young Americans and appeared in over 30 stage productions from the age of 4–17, ranging from musicals to Shakespeare.  She studied acting at the Lee Strasberg Institute and comedy at Groundlings in Los Angeles with fellow actor P.J. Byrne.

In 2003, while being a performer and musician, Valenti started her business career working for Taco Bell working her way up from Administrative Assistant to Art Director in the Creative Department. Her creativity for marketing was discovered by then CMO Greg Creed, who asked her to join the marketing think tank team. As part of that team, she helped develop nationally recognized PR and marketing strategies such as the World Series Target in Left Field for Free Tacos.

In 2007, while working at Taco Bell, Valenti began her side hustle, her own company Grow Vision. In 2010, Valenti became a creative contract talent with the Taco Bell Creative Team. Along with internal leadership, Greta helped form the basis for Taco Bell's social media and the creation of the online content the brand is known for today.

In 2012, she left Taco Bell and transitioned to Grow Vision full-time. Taco Bell became the company's main corporate client, while the team also produced the show Live From Daryl's House.

In May 2019, after developing her luxury edibles concept brand, Greta was hired by B2B soil to oil and B2C cannabis retail startup People's as the Director of Marketing for the company. Greta left People's in May 2021 to return to Grow Vision full-time.

As of July 2021, Valenti is a full-time director, creator, writer, and touring musician.

Film & Music

Grow Vision 
Valenti is CEO and Creative Director of Grow Vision, a full-service boutique creative agency and production company. Valenti formed Grow Vision as a web design company in 2007 and grew it into a fully fledged production company when she partnered with her now spouse Robin Davey. The two grew the company and now produce content for corporate clients such as Taco Bell, PepsiCo, Interscope, Dine Brands Global, Educational Insights, and Irvine Company. They produced the television show Live From Daryl's House for Viacom Network for two years, as well as music videos for Jet, Papa Roach, Bush and many more.

In 2017, Valenti began directing music videos and films.

Released in 2019, Valenti's first feature-length documentary, co-directed by Robin Davey, The Unbelievable Plight of Mrs Wright, has won over 67 film festival awards.

Grow Vision: studios  
In July 2021, Grow Vision Studios opened as a Motown-inspired retro recording and livestream studio in Southern California.

Grow Vision: music  
In 2011,  Valenti's Grow Vision launched its record label and publishing company to sign and manage their musical project, Well Hung Heart. Since that time, the label has five album releases for Well Hung Heart and Beaux Gris Gris & The Apocalypse.

Well Hung Heart 
Valenti performed with various bands in the Orange County, California, area before she formed the rock trio Well Hung Heart with Robin Davey in 2011. With Well Hung Heart she has released three albums, Young Enough To Know It All (2013), Go Forth and Multiply (2014), and the self-titled EP Well Hung Heart (2016). Well Hung Heart won the 2014 Best Live Band award at the OC Music Awards as well as Best Music Video. Well Hung Heart continues to tour extensively in both America and Europe and was one of the headliners on the Axis Entertainment stage at the 2015 Rocklahoma Festival in Oklahoma. The band continued to tour and release music. At their November 2018 show, the band surprised fans by getting William Hung to sing All Star (song) by Smash Mouth with them on stage. In Fall 2017, the band had a couple of opportunities to open for Orange County legends The Offspring. In May 2018, Well Hung Heart played the second stage at Rocklahoma opening for Machine Gun Kelly. In August 2018 Well Hung Heart played the main stage at Buffalo Chip Campground, opening for Foreigner.

Beaux Gris Gris and The Apocalypse 
In 2017, Valenti along with partner Robin Davey created the New-Orleans-influenced blues band Beaux Gris Gris and The Apocalypse. The band features a variety of well-known musicians from the British Blues scene, including members of The Hoax, King King, and Joanne Shaw Taylor bands. The band has released a sampler EP called The Appetizer and a full-length album called Love & Murder. Valenti directed them and edited the music video for their single "Heart Breaker". Their single "Louisiana Good Ride" was featured on the Cerys Matthews BBC Radio 2 Blues show. The band has toured the Uk, Europe, and select cities in the United States. As with many artists, the COVID-19 pandemic delayed the release of their second album and subsequent European tour to early 2022.

Writing 
Valenti has written articles and essays for several publications from Classic Rock magazine, Muse by Clio, LouderSound.com, and more.

Notable articles:

 "No Girls Allowed" for Classic Rock/Louder Sound
 "Canna-Censored: The Challenges of Cannabis Marketing" for Muse by Clio

References

Living people
American women rock singers
Year of birth missing (living people)
The Young Americans members
21st-century American women